Víctor Manuel Pons Núñez (April 5, 1935 – November 11, 1999) was a former Chief Justice of the Supreme Court of Puerto Rico. He previously had served as Secretary of State of Puerto Rico from 1973 until 1974.

Born in Rio Piedras, Puerto Rico, Pons earned a juris doctor in 1959 from the University of Puerto Rico School of Law. He was appointed Chief Justice by Governor Rafael Hernández Colón in 1985, and he headed the high court until his retirement in 1992.

A prominent private-sector attorney, Pons managed Hernández Colón's electoral campaigns before holding public office. He died on November 11, 1999 at 64 years of age.

Sources 
La Justicia en sus Manos, by Luis Rafael Rivera, 2007,

References

|-

1935 births
1999 deaths
Chief Justices of the Supreme Court of Puerto Rico
People from Río Piedras, Puerto Rico
Secretaries of State of Puerto Rico
20th-century American judges